Min'an Ave. station is an interchange station of the Loop Line and Line 4 of Chongqing Rail Transit in Yubei District of Chongqing Municipality, China. The station opened on 11 January 2019. It serves the area surrounding Min'an Avenue, including nearby office buildings and residential blocks.

Station Structure
2 island platforms are built for Loop Line trains & Line 4 trains.
Once the Western extension of Line 4 opens, the directions of its platforms will be reversed. Then the one on B2 will be used for all eastbound trains (towards Huangling), while the other one on B3 will be used for westbound trains (towards Panguilu) only.

Exits
There are a total of 4 entrances/exits currently in use for the station. Exits 2, 4A & 4B are under construction.

Surroundings

Nearby Places
Min'an Avenue
Renhe Avenue
Taishan Avenue
Tianlong Road
Yungang Road
Tongxing Primary School

Nearby Stations
Chongqing North Station North Square station (a Line 4 & Line 10 Station)
Chongqing North Station South Square station (a Loop Line, Line 3 & Line 10 station)
Honghudonglu station (a Loop Line station)

See also
Chongqing Rail Transit (CRT)
Loop Line (CRT)
Line 4 (CRT)

References

Railway stations in Chongqing
Railway stations in China opened in 2019
Chongqing Rail Transit stations